Vilanova d'Alcolea is a municipality in the province of Castelló, Valencian Community, Spain. The town is located inland 36 km northeast of the town of Castelló de la Plana, on the north of the Valencian Community. It is a rural dryland farming town surrounded by vineyards as well as olive, almond and carob trees.

History
Historically Vilanova d'Alcolea used to depend from Les Coves de Vinromà and, after the Moorish time to Blasco de Alagón, then in 1245 to the Knights of Calatrava and in 1295 to the Knights Templar. Finally from the year 1319 onwards it fell under the protection of the Knights of Montesa. Until the 19th century neighboring La Torre d'en Doménec depended from the Vilanova d'Alcolea parish.

Airport

The airport of Castelló de la Plana, Aeroport de Castelló - Costa Azahar, has been built 2 km south of this town. Despite having been completed in 2011, the airport is still not in operation because of doubts about its viability for Valencia's Manises airport is relatively near to Castelló. Some groups that were concerned about the ecology of the region have questioned both the location and the need for the airport, but it was built nonetheless.

Villages
Vilanova d'Alcolea
 Mas de Calaf
 Els Pasqualets

References

External links

 Ajuntament de Vilanova d'Alcolea
 Institut Valencià d'Estadística
Portal de la Direcció General d'Administració Local de la Generalitat

Plana Alta
Municipalities in the Province of Castellón